Hans Sørensen (1 June 1900 – 28 March 1984) was a Danish sailor. He competed in the 6 Metre event at the 1948 Summer Olympics.

References

External links
 

1900 births
1984 deaths
Danish male sailors (sport)
Olympic sailors of Denmark
Sailors at the 1948 Summer Olympics – 6 Metre
Sportspeople from Aarhus